John Timu may refer to:

 John Timu (American football) (born 1992), American football linebacker
 John Timu (rugby) (born 1969), former rugby footballer